Lithuania has sent four entries to the Junior Eurovision Song Contest, first entering at the 2007 Contest in Rotterdam.

The national selection process occurs during the show Mažųjų žvaigždžių ringas (Young Stars Ring), in which young singers aged 10–15 will take part with self-written songs.

The 2007 Lithuanian entry was Lina Jurevičiūtė, a.k.a. Lina Joy, with the song "Kai miestas snaudžia", who finished 13th in the contest.

The 2008 entry was Eglė Jurgaitytė with "Laiminga diena", which ended third for Lithuania at the 2008 Contest in Limassol.

After two years of participating LRT withdrew due to financial reasons from the festival in 2009. But they returned in 2010. That year LRT sent Bartas with the song "Oki Doki". It placed 6th out of 14 participants.

They also participated in 2011 and sent Paulina Skrabytė with the song "Debesys" which placed 10th.

In 2012, the country withdrew again due to expenses. Lithuania has not returned to the contest since.

Participation overview

Commentators and spokespersons

The contests are broadcast online worldwide through the official Junior Eurovision Song Contest website junioreurovision.tv and YouTube. In 2015, the online broadcasts featured commentary in English by junioreurovision.tv editor Luke Fisher and 2011 Bulgarian Junior Eurovision Song Contest entrant Ivan Ivanov. The Lithuanian broadcaster, LRT, sent their own commentators to the contest in order to provide commentary in the Lithuanian language. Spokespersons were also chosen by the national broadcaster in order to announce the awarding points from Lithuania. The table below list the details of each commentator and spokesperson since 2007.

See also
 Lithuania in the Eurovision Dance Contest – Dance version of the Eurovision Song Contest.
 Lithuania in the Eurovision Song Contest – Senior version of the Junior Eurovision Song Contest.
 Lithuania in the Eurovision Young Musicians – A competition organised by the EBU for musicians aged 18 years and younger.

References 

Countries in the Junior Eurovision Song Contest
Lithuanian music